Victor Valley Union High School District (VVUHSD) is a school district in the Victor Valley of San Bernardino County, southern California.

It serves grades 7-12 in the Victor Valley region of the Mojave Desert, including the towns of Victorville and Adelanto.

It operates eight schools.  it has about 9,600 students and over 900 faculty members.

The Victor Valley Union High School District headquarters are in Victorville.

Schools
Comprehensive high schools (grades 9-12):
 Adelanto High School
 Silverado High School
 Victor Valley High School

Comprehensive junior high schools (grades 7-8):
 Imogene Garner Hook Junior High School

Magnet schools (grades 7-12):
 Cobalt Institute of Math & Science
 Lakeview Leadership Academy
 University Preparatory School

Alternative schools:
 Goodwill Education Center
 Victor Valley Adult School

Feeder districts

 Victor Elementary School District
 Adelanto Elementary School District

References

External links

 

School districts in San Bernardino County, California
Victor Valley
Victorville, California